Colin Mark is a British teacher, lexicographer and writer on the linguistics of Scottish Gaelic. He is the author of three books, a number of articles as well as short stories published in the Gaelic language quarterly Gairm.

After study at Peterhead Academy Colin Mark achieved an undergraduate degree in classics from the University of Aberdeen. He taught for nearly 40 years in a number of schools in the south-east and north-east of Scotland.

His Gaelic Verbs Systemised and Simplified (2006) received widespread praise including from Ruairidh MacIlleathain, BBC Alba journalist and writer, who praised the book's attention to idiom.

His Gaelic to English Dictionary (2002) is one of a small number of Scottish Gaelic dictionaries in the modern era and has received praise for its practical and user friendly nature. David Stifter, who reviewed the dictionary in Language the journal of the Linguistic Society of America praised the dictionary's comprehensiveness, including over 90,000 entries gathered from twenty years of study, in his opinion unparalleled except by older dictionaries by Edward Dwelly and Malcolm MacLennan. The dictionary was also recommended by Victor Price.

Mark resides in the Scottish seaside town of Buckie with his wife Jean.


Works

Books 
 Gaelic Verbs. Glasgow University Press (Roinn nan Cànan Ceilteach Oilthigh Ghlaschu) 1986. 
 The Gaelic-English Dictionary. Routledge 2002   (hardback)  (paperback)
 Gaelic Verbs Systemised and Simplified. Steve Savage Publishers 2006

Short stories 

Short stories (in Gaelic) by Colin Mark include:
 "Smuaintean ann an Taigh-seinnse" (Thoughts in a Pub) Gairm 127 (1984)
 "Liombo" (Limbo) Gairm 133 (1985)
 "Ath-thilleadh Fhearghuis" (Fergus Returns) Gairm 136 (1986)
 "An Ioma-shlighe" (The Labyrinth) Gairm 143 (1988)
 "Craobh an t-Saoghail" (Tree of the World) Gairm 152 (1990)

References

Scottish schoolteachers
Scottish lexicographers
Scottish Gaelic writers
Alumni of the University of Aberdeen
Living people
Year of birth missing (living people)